The Blue Eyes  is a 2013 musical score by Australian composer J. G. Thirlwell for the film of the same name, written and directed by Eva Aridjis. Recorded in January 2011, the album was released on December 3, 2013, by Ectopic Ents. The score marks a musical departure for Thirlwell, exhibiting a more sombre tone compared to his previous soundtrack work for The Venture Bros.

Reception
The score received mixed critical reviews. In writing for The Wire, Clive Bell felt that while the music was at times effectively terrifying, it too often felt recycled and lacking in originality. Marc Masters of Pitchfork Media gave the album 6.2 out of 10, describing the score as typical and concluding that it "is too conventionally filmic to provide a full experience by itself. It feels more in service of someone else's images than capable of inspiring them on its own."

Track listing

Personnel

Musicians
Isabel Castelvi – cello
James Ilgenfritz – contrabass
Nathan Koci – French horn
Marcus Rojas – bass trombone, tuba
J. G. Thirlwell – instruments, producer, design
Karen Waltuch – violin, viola

Technical personnel
Heung-Heung Chin – art direction
Marietta Davis – photography
Scott Hull – mastering

Release history

References

2013 soundtrack albums
Horror film soundtracks
JG Thirlwell albums
Albums produced by JG Thirlwell
Single-artist film soundtracks